EasyLink is a trade name which may refer to several technologies:

 The EasyLink trade name used by Philips for the Consumer Electronics Control (CEC) feature of the HDMI standard, used to control connected multimedia devices.
 The EasyLink service, one of the first marketable computer-based email systems for non-government users made by Western Union, now operated separately by EasyLink Services International Corporation.